Joanna Moore (born Dorothy Joanne Cook, November 10, 1934 – November 22, 1997) was an American film and television actress, who, between 1956 and 1976, appeared in 17 feature films and guest-starred in nearly a hundred television series episodes. After 1976, personal problems derailed her career and she landed only two minor film roles.

From 1963 to 1967, she was married to actor Ryan O'Neal, with whom she had two children, Griffin O'Neal and Tatum O'Neal.

Moore's career hit its peak in the 1960s. During that time, she guest-starred in several popular shows, including Alfred Hitchcock Presents, Perry Mason, The Fugitive, Bewitched, and The Real McCoys. One of her recurring roles was as Sheriff Andy Taylor's love interest, Peggy "Peg" McMillan in four episodes of The Andy Griffith Show, from 1962 to 1963. Moore was a guest star in such television Westerns as The Rifleman, Wagon Train, Gunsmoke, The Rebel,  The High Chaparral, The Wild Wild West and The Virginian. By the 1970s, her career began to wane because of drug and alcohol misuse. Moore made her final onscreen appearance in 1986, and died of lung cancer in 1997.

Early life
Moore was born Dorothy Joanne Cook in Americus, Georgia, the elder of two daughters of Dorothy Martha (née English) and Henry Anderson Cook III. In 1941, when she was a child, her parents and younger sister were involved in a fatal car accident. Her mother and sister died immediately, while her father died from his injuries a year after the accident. Moore was then adopted by a wealthy local family and changed her name from Dorothy to Joanna.

As a teen, she married and quickly divorced Willis Moore in 1951. After the divorce, she attended Agnes Scott College in Decatur, Georgia. While attending college, she entered and won a beauty contest and was brought to Hollywood. Moore's acting career began when a producer for Universal Studios spotted her at a cocktail party.

Career

1950s
Moore made her television debut in the November 8, 1956 episode of Lux Video Theatre. The following year, she made her film debut in the 1957 crime drama Appointment with a Shadow. Later that year, she appeared in episodes of Goodyear Theatre and Harbormaster, along with another film, Slim Carter. In 1958, she had a small role in the film noir classic Touch of Evil with Orson Welles, Charlton Heston, Janet Leigh, and Marlene Dietrich, followed by more substantial roles in the horror film Monster on the Campus and the Western Ride a Crooked Trail.

From 1958 to 1959, Moore landed guest spots on television, including Westinghouse Studio One, Suspicion, The Rough Riders, Bourbon Street Beat, Bat Masterson, The Real McCoys, Maverick,  The Rifleman, and Riverboat.  She made a guest appearance on Perry Mason as the title character in the 1958 episode "The Case of the Terrified Typist".

1960s
During the 1960s, Moore continued her career guest-starring on numerous television shows in addition to film appearances. From 1960 to 1961, she guest-starred on Five Fingers, The Rebel, Hong Kong, The Untouchables, 77 Sunset Strip, Going My Way, and Empire.

In 1962, Moore appeared as Miss Precious in Walk on the Wild Side with Jane Fonda, Barbara Stanwyck, and Capucine, followed by the musical, Follow That Dream with Elvis Presley. That same year, Moore appeared in four episodes of The Andy Griffith Show as Peggy "Peg" McMillan, Sheriff Taylor's love interest. In 1963, she co-starred in Son of Flubber and was cast in The Man from Galveston, intended as the pilot for Temple Houston. Also that year, she made a second guest appearance on Perry Mason as Grace Olney in "The Case of the Reluctant Model". In 1964, she guest-starred on Bob Hope Presents the Chrysler Theatre.

From 1965 to 1967, Moore guest starred on The Man from U.N.C.L.E., The Rogues, My Three Sons, Peyton Place (starring Moore's then-husband, Ryan O'Neal), Daniel Boone, Cowboy in Africa, and Iron Horse. In 1967, Moore appeared as Daphne Harper, a snob and former college beauty queen chum of Darrin's, in the "Charlie Harper, Winner" episode of Bewitched.  During the time, Moore also had an uncredited role as Angie, the widow of Jesse Cole, in Nevada Smith starring Steve McQueen.

Throughout the 1950s and 1960s, Moore also made multiple appearances on The Millionaire, The United States Steel Hour, Route 66, Wagon Train, Alfred Hitchcock Presents (and The Alfred Hitchcock Hour), Hawaiian Eye, Alcoa Premiere, Gunsmoke, The Fugitive, The Virginian, The High Chaparral, and The F.B.I.

1970s and 1980s
During the 1970s, Moore continued with guest roles on Nanny and the Professor, The Governor & J.J., and McCloud. In 1973, she appeared in the television adaption of the 1954 film Three Coins in the Fountain, also starring Yvonne Craig and Cynthia Pepper.  In 1974, she appeared on The Waltons in the episode entitled "The Departure". In 1975, she co-starred in the feature film The Hindenburg. The next year, she guest-starred on Petrocelli and The Blue Knight and made two appearances on Bronk.

By the late 1970s, Moore's career had begun to wane owing to personal problems. Her only two on-screen appearances after 1976 were in a supporting role in the 1980 television film Scout's Honor starring Gary Coleman and a bit part in the 1986 Australian film Run Chrissie Run!

Personal life

Hearing loss
In the early 1960s, Moore became deaf as a result of otosclerosis, which her doctor said resulted from a deposit of calcium in her middle ear. Moore said that she had to read lips to understand what people were saying. An operation restored her hearing in 1962.

Marriages and children
On April 3, 1963, Moore married her third husband, actor Ryan O'Neal. The couple had two children: Tatum O'Neal and Griffin O'Neal. The marriage was tempestuous and the couple separated in early 1966. In February 1967, their divorce became final.

In February 1975, she married roofing contractor Gary L. Reeves. They divorced in 1977.

Drug and alcohol addiction
Around the time of her separation from O'Neal, Moore began to misuse alcohol and drugs, namely amphetamines, and became addicted. She continued acting, but her depression worsened over her impending divorce.

In 1970, Moore checked into the Camarillo State Hospital for psychiatric treatment. The next year, she was arrested for drunk driving after getting into a fight while she and their children were visiting O'Neal's Malibu home. After her arrest, she lost custody of her children.

By the late 1970s, she was being supported financially by her daughter, Tatum, who had become an Academy Award-winning actress at age 10 and one of the highest-paid child stars of the era. The children were still in Ryan O'Neal's custody, and despite treatment, Moore continued to misuse drugs and alcohol. As a result, she was arrested five times for DUI during the 1980s.

Death
In 1996, Moore, a longtime smoker, was diagnosed with lung cancer. On November 22, 1997, she died from the disease twelve days after her 63rd birthday. Her daughter Tatum was by her side at the time of her death. Moore was interred at Hillside Memorial Park in Redlands, California, but her family later moved her remains to Oak Grove Cemetery in her home town of Americus, Georgia.

Cultural reference
Moore's grandson Kevin McEnroe (son of Tatum O'Neal and John McEnroe) wrote a roman à clef about her, which was titled Our Town and  published in 2015.

Selected filmography

References

External links

1934 births
1997 deaths
20th-century American actresses
Actresses from Georgia (U.S. state)
Agnes Scott College people
American film actresses
American television actresses
Deaths from lung cancer in California
People from Americus, Georgia
People from Indian Wells, California
Actresses from Los Angeles
Western (genre) film actresses